Wintle may refer to:

People
 Alfred Wintle (1897–1966), British Army officer
 Frank Wintle (born 1929), English footballer
 Francis Edward Wintle (known by pen-name Edward Rutherfurd) (born 1948), British novelist
 Jack William Wintle (1908–1942), US Navy officer
 Justin Wintle (born 1939), English writer
 Mary Harriet Wintle (1834–1876), birth name of Australian watercolourist Mary Gedye
 Ryan Wintle (born 1997), English footballer
 Walter Wintle, American poet

Other
 Characters in Wintle's Wonders (aka Dancing Shoes) by Noel Streatfeild
 USS Wintle (DE-25), US Navy destroyer in World War II

English-language surnames